This is a short list of some significant Luthiers.

15th – 19th centuries

20th century

Contemporary

Experimental luthiers

 Ivor Darreg
 Ellen Fullman
 Yuri Landman
 Joseph Nagyvary
 Harry Partch
 Bradford Reed
 Hans Reichel

 
Lists of people by occupation